Bozen may refer to:
Bolzano, a bi-lingual northern Italian provincial capital city of which Bozen is the official German name
Bözen, a Swiss municipality
Bożeń, a village in Poland
Bozen, Susurluk, a village in Turkey
Bozen Green, a village in Hertfordshire, England

See also
 Bernard Bolzano